Joyce Clarence Pipkin (January 9, 1924 – April 11, 2017) was an American football offensive end who played for the New York Giants and Los Angeles Dons. He played college football at the University of Arkansas, having previously attended Hot Springs High School in his home state of Arkansas. He died in 2017 at the age of 93.

References

American football ends
Arkansas Razorbacks football players
New York Giants players
Los Angeles Dons players
Players of American football from Arkansas
People from Hot Spring County, Arkansas
1924 births
2017 deaths